Davitt Sigerson (born 1957) is an American novelist whose first career was in the music business. Sigerson was a record producer, singer, songwriter, record company executive, and journalist.

Early life, education, and career
Davitt Sigerson was born in New York City, New York. After attending school at Oxford University in England, he remained in the UK, writing about music for Black Music, Sounds, Melody Maker, and Time Out, before returning to the U.S. in 1979, where he also wrote for The Village Voice, Rolling Stone and The New York Times. In 1976, he arranged a version of the Gamble and Huff song "For the Love of Money", released by the Disco Dub Band on the Movers label.

In the early 1980s he released two solo albums for ZE as a singer-songwriter, Davitt Sigerson (1980) and Falling in Love Again (1984). Also that year, he wrote and produced 'No Time to Stop Believing' under the band name Daisy Chain. In 1990, he recorded a further album, Experiments in Terror, with keyboardist Bob Thiele Jr., as The Royal Macadamians.

He also wrote songs for or with various artists including Philip Bailey, Loverboy, Prism, John Entwistle of the Who, and Gene Simmons of Kiss, with whom he wrote the song "Good Girl Gone Bad" on the 1987 album Crazy Nights. In addition, he worked as a record producer, producing Olivia Newton-John, the Bangles, Tori Amos and David & David among others.

He became president of Polydor Records in 1991; president of EMI and Chrysalis Records in 1994; and chairman of Island Records from 1998 to 1999. For Jim Henson, he wrote the lyrics to "Everyone Matters" from It's a Very Merry Muppet Christmas Movie with the music by Desmond Child.

His first novel, Faithful, was published in 2004 by Doubleday in the US.

Sigerson currently lives in New York City with his wife. Together they have two daughters.

Discography
 Davitt Sigerson (ZE, 1980)
 Falling in Love Again (ZE, 1984)
 Experiments In Terror (Island, 1990) (as member of The Royal Macadamians)

References

External links

1957 births
Living people
Record producers from New York (state)
American rock singers
American male singer-songwriters
American rock songwriters
20th-century American singers
20th-century American composers
21st-century American novelists
American music industry executives
American male novelists
American music journalists
A&M Records artists
ZE Records artists
Businesspeople from New York City
Singers from New York City
Journalists from New York City
Writers from New York City
The Village Voice people
Rolling Stone people
The New York Times people
21st-century American male writers
Novelists from New York (state)
21st-century American non-fiction writers
American male non-fiction writers
20th-century American male singers
Singer-songwriters from New York (state)